"Giving Up" is a 1969 hit song performed by The Ad Libs.

Giving Up may also refer to:

 "Giving Up", a song from the album Two Hearts by Men at Work
 "Giving Up", a song from the album When Broken Is Easily Fixed by Silverstein

See also
 Givin' It Up, a recording/collaboration between Al Jarreau and George Benson
 Give Up (disambiguation)
 Give It Up (disambiguation)